A by-election was held for the New South Wales Legislative Assembly electorate of Bathurst on 6 May 1967 following the death of Gus Kelly.

Dates

Results

Gus Kelly died.

See also
Electoral results for the district of Bathurst
List of New South Wales state by-elections

References

1967 elections in Australia
New South Wales state by-elections
1960s in New South Wales
May 1967 events in Australia